This self-titled EP is the debut release by The Cops.

Track listing
 "The Shake" – 2:14
 "Rectify" – 3:18
 "Identify" – 2:50
 "Treat You Like A Dog" – 1:29

External links
 The Cops Homepage

The Cops (Australian band) albums
2004 debut EPs